Hashamar (also Romanized as Ḩashamar) is a village in Zamkan Rural District, in the Central District of Salas-e Babajani County, Kermanshah Province, Iran. At the 2006 census, its population was 396, in 93 families.

References 

Populated places in Salas-e Babajani County